The Wa Democratic Party (abbreviated WDP) is a political party in Myanmar (Burma). The party was founded in 2010 to contest in the 2010 general election. In the 2015 general election, the party won a single seat in the Pyithu Hluttaw, and 2 seats in the Shan State Hluttaw.

References

2010 establishments in Myanmar
Political parties established in 2010
Political parties in Myanmar
Wa political parties